Scumpia is a commune in Făleşti District, Moldova. It is composed of four villages: Hîrtop, Măgureanca, Nicolaevca and Scumpia.

References

Communes of Fălești District